The U.S. state of Pennsylvania is divided into 1,547 townships in 67 counties. For listings of townships in individual counties, see the category Townships in Pennsylvania by county.

See also
List of municipalities in Pennsylvania
List of cities in Pennsylvania
List of counties in Pennsylvania
List of Pennsylvania municipalities and counties with home rule charters, optional charters, or optional plans
List of towns and boroughs in Pennsylvania

External links
Pennsylvania State Association of Township Supervisors
National Association of Towns and Townships

 
Pennsylvania
Pennsylvania geography-related lists